Hield Bros , or simply Hield, is an English textile manufacturer and retailer of men's clothing and luxury goods. The company was established in 1922. In addition to manufacturing cloth for its own suits, Hield produces cloth for many labels and has supplied the upholstery used in Queen Elizabeth II's custom Bentley State Limousine.

History
Founded as the Hield Brothers by David and Hugh Hield in 1922 in West Yorkshire, England, Hield Bros. is based in Briggella Mills, West Yorkshire. The company was acquired by the Chamsi-Pasha family in 1981 when it was under threat of a hostile take-over.

The company manufactures cloth for both apparel and furniture, suits, shirts, neckties, knitwear, scarves and throws, shoes, luggage, small leather goods and accessories and has twice been awarded the Queen's Award for Export. Forbes magazine lists a $21,000 set of 7 Hield suits as one of the "best ways to blow your bonus".

The company has shops in London's Savile Row, Japan, the Middle East and the USA.

Gallery

References

External links
 Official Website
 Forbes: Best Ways To Blow Your Bonus
 Robb Report: Well Hield
 Robb Report: Her Majesty's Car
 Wool Record

English brands
Luxury brands
Shops in London
High fashion brands
Fashion accessory brands
Clothing companies established in 1922
Companies based in Bradford
Textile manufacturers of England
Suit makers
Clothing companies of England
Clothing brands of the United Kingdom
1922 establishments in England
Retail companies established in 1922
Manufacturing companies established in 1922